This is an incomplete list of Soviet and Russian military aircraft, from the Soviet Union's foundation in 1917 until its present state as Russia.

Briev

Production
Military aircraft
 MBR-2 - 1931 maritime patrol flying boat
 MBR-7 - 1937 reconnaissance flying boat and light bomber
 Be-2 - 1936 reconnaissance floatplane
 Be-10 - 1956 maritime patrol flying boat 
 Be-12 - 1960 anti-submarine and maritime patrol flying boat 
 S-13 - high-altitude reconnaissance aircraft
 A-40 - 1986 anti-submarine warfare amphibious flying boat
 A-50 - 1978 airborne early warning and control aircraft
 A-60 - 1981 airborne laser laboratory
 A-100 - 2016 airborne early warning and control aircraft
Civilian aircraft
 Be-103 - 1997 passenger and utility transport flying boat 
 Be-200 - 1998 multirole flying boat

Experimental
Military aircraft
 MDR-5 - 1938 reconnaissance aircraft
 R-1 - 1952 flying boat 
 Be-1 - 1964 experimental ground effect aircraft
 Be-4 - 1940 reconnaissance flying boat
 Be-6 - 1949 maritime patrol flying boat
 VVA-14 - 1972 ground effect aircraft 
Civilian aircraft
 Be-8 - 1947 passenger and liaison floatplane
 Be-30 - 1967 regional airliner and utility transport aircraft

Planned
 Be-112 - passenger flying boat

Ilyushin

Production
Military aircraft
 DB-3 - 1935 bomber
 DB-4 - 1940 bomber
 Il-2 - 1939 ground-attack aircraft
 Il-4 - 1936 bomber
 Il-10 - 1944 ground-attack aircraft
 Il-14 - 1950 military transport aircraft
 Il-28 - 1948 tactical bomber
 Il-38 - 1971 maritime patrol and anti-submarine aircraft
 Il-78 - 1983 tanker
 Il-80 - 1987 airborne command and control aircraft
 Il-103 - 1994 trainer 
Civilian aircraft
 Il-12 - 1945 transport aircraft
 Il-18 - 1957 airliner
 Il-62 - 1963 airliner
 Il-76 - 1971 transport aircraft
 Il-86 - 1976 airliner
 Il-96 - 1988 airliner
 Il-114 - 1990 regional airliner

Experimental
Military aircraft
 I-21 - 1936 fighter
 Il-1 - 1944 fighter
 Il-6 - 1943 bomber
 Il-8 - 1943 ground-attack aircraft
 Il-16 - 1945 ground-attack aircraft
 Il-20 - 1948 ground-attack aircraft
 Il-22 - 1947 bomber
 Il-30 - tactical bomber
 Il-40 - 1953 ground-attack aircraft
 Il-46 - 1952 bomber
 Il-54 - 1955 bomber
 Il-102 - 1982 ground-attack aircraft
 Il-106 - proposed military transport aircraft
Civilian aircraft
 Il-18 (1946) - 1946 airliner
 Il-108 - proposed business jet

Planned
 Il-112 - planned military transport aircraft
 Il-214 - planned military transport aircraft

Gliders
 Il-32 - 1948 transport glider

Lavochkin

Production
 LaGG-3 - 1940 fighter
 La-5 - 1942 fighter
 La-7 - 1944 fighter
 La-9 - 1946 fighter
 La-11 - 1947 fighter
 La-15 - 1948 fighter

Experimental
 LaGG-1 - 1940 fighter
 La-126 - 1946 fighter
 La-150 - 1946 fighter
 La-152 - 1946 fighter
 La-160 - 1947 fighter
 La-168 - 1948 fighter
 La-190 - 1951 fighter
 La-200 - 1949 fighter
 La-250 - 1956 interceptor

Unmanned aerial vehicles
 La-17 - 1953 unmanned aerial vehicle

Mikoyan

Production
 MiG-1 - 1940 fighter
 MiG-3 - 1940 fighter and interceptor
 MiG-9 - 1946 fighter
 MiG-15 - 1947 fighter
 MiG-17 - 1950 fighter
 MiG-19 - 1952 fighter
 MiG-21 - 1956 fighter and interceptor 
 MiG-23 - 1967 fighter and fighter-bomber
 MiG-25 - 1964 interceptor and reconnaissance aircraft 
 MiG-27 - 1970 ground-attack aircraft 
 MiG-29 - 1977 air superiority fighter and multirole fighter
 MiG-29M - improved multirole fighter variant of the MiG-29
 MiG-29K - 1988 all-weather carrier-based multirole fighter  
 MiG-31 - 1975 interceptor
 MiG-35 - 2009 multirole fighter

Experimental
Military aircraft
 DIS - 1941 escort fighter 
 MiG-6 - ground-attack aircraft
 MiG-8 - 1945 liaison aircraft
 I-211 - 1943 fighter 
 I-250 - 1945 fighter 
 I-270 - 1946 interceptor 
 I-320 - 1949 all-weather interceptor
 I-350 - 1951 fighter 
 I-3 - 1956 fighter 
 I-7 - 1957 interceptor
 I-75 - 1958 interceptor
 Ye-8 - 1962 fighter
 Ye-150 family - 1959 interceptor
 MiG-105 - 1976 test vehicle
 MiG-33 - proposed light strike fighter
 MiG-AT - 1996 advanced trainer and light attack aircraft
 Project 1.44 - 2000 technology demonstrator
Civilian aircraft
 MiG-110 - 1995 passenger and cargo aircraft

Planned
 LMFS - projected stealth light multirole fighter
 MiG-41 - projected interceptor

Unmanned aerial vehicles
 Skat - proposed unmanned combat aerial vehicle

Myasishchev

Production
Military aircraft
 M-4 - 1953 strategic bomber
 M-55 - 1978 high-altitude reconnaissance aircraft
 VM-T - 1981 military transport aircraft
Civilian aircraft
 M-101T - 1995 passenger aircraft

Experimental
 M-18 - proposed bomber
 M-50 - 1959 strategic bomber
 M-60 - proposed bomber

Sukhoi

Production
Military aircraft
 Su-2 - 1937 reconnaissance aircraft and light bomber
 Su-7 - 1955 fighter and fighter-bomber/ground-attack aircraft
 Su-9 - 1956 interceptor
 Su-11 - 1958 interceptor
 Su-15 - 1962 interceptor
 Su-17 - 1966 fighter-bomber
 Su-24 - 1967 all-weather attack aircraft
 Su-25 - 1975 close air support aircraft
 Su-27 - 1977 multirole fighter and air superiority fighter
 Su-30 - 1989 multirole fighter
 Su-30MKI - 1997 multirole air superiority fighter
 Su-30MKK - 2000 all-weather strike fighter
 Su-30MKM - 2007 air superiority fighter and multirole fighter
 Su-33 - 1987 carrier-based air superiority fighter and multirole fighter 
 Su-34 - 1990 fighter-bomber and strike fighter 
 Su-35 - 1988 multirole air superiority fighter
 Su-57 - 2010 stealth air superiority fighter

Civilian aircraft
 Su-26 - 1984 aerobatic aircraft
 Su-29 - aerobatic aircraft
 Su-31 - 1992 aerobatic aircraft
 Su-80 - 2001 transport aircraft
 Superjet 100 - 2008 regional jet

Experimental
Military aircraft
 Su-1 - 1940 fighter 
 Su-6 - 1941 ground-attack aircraft
 Su-8 - 1944 ground-attack aircraft
 Su-9 (1946) - 1946 fighter
 Su-10 - 1946 bomber
 Su-12 -  1947 reconnaissance aircraft
 Su-15 (1949) - 1949 all-weather interceptor
 Su-17 (1949) - 1949 fighter
 Su-28 - trainer
 Su-37 - 1996 multirole fighter 
 Su-47 - 1997 technology demonstrator
 T-3 - 1956 interceptor
 T-4 - 1972 reconnaissance aircraft and strategic bomber
 P-1 - 1957 interceptor
 T-60S - 1984 bomber
 S-54 - trainer, light fighter and carrier-capable light fighter
Civilian aircraft
 Su-38 - 2001 agricultural aircraft
 S-21 - business jet
 KR-860 - 2000 airliner

Planned
 FGFA - stealth air superiority fighter
 Superjet 130 - airliner

Tupolev

Production
Military aircraft
 ANT-3 - 1925 reconnaissance aircraft
 ANT-7 - 1929 reconnaissance aircraft
 TB-1 - 1925 heavy bomber
 I-4 - 1927 fighter
 TB-3 - 1930 heavy bomber
 MTB-1 - 1934 maritime patrol flying boat
 DB-1 - 1934 bomber
 SB - 1934 fast bomber
 Tu-2 - 1941 medium bomber
 Tu-4 - 1947 strategic bomber
 Tu-14 - 1949 torpedo bomber
 Tu-16 - 1952 strategic bomber
 Tu-22 - 1959 medium bomber
 Tu-22M - 1969 strategic bomber
 Tu-28 - 1964 interceptor
 Tu-95 - 1952 strategic bomber 
 Tu-126 - 1962 airborne early warning and control aircraft
 Tu-142 - 1968 maritime patrol and anti-submarine warfare aircraft
 Tu-160 - 1981 strategic bomber
Civilian aircraft
 ANT-9 - 1929 airliner
 ANT-35 - 1936 airliner
 Tu-104 - 1955 airliner
 Tu-114 - 1957 airliner
 Tu-124 - 1960 airliner
 Tu-134 - 1963 airliner
 Tu-144 - 1957 airliner
 Tu-154 - 1968 airliner
 Tu-204 - 1989 airliner

Experimental
Military aircraft
 ANT-1 - 1923 experimental aircraft
 ANT-8 - 1931 maritime patrol flying boat
 ANT-10 - 1930 reconnaissance aircraft and light bomber
 ANT-16 - 1933 heavy bomber
 ANT-21 - 1933 fighter
 ANT-22 - 1934 reconnaissance flying boat
 ANT-25 - 1933 experimental aircraft
 ANT-29 - 1935 fighter
 ANT-37 - 1935 bomber
 ANT-41 - 1936 torpedo bomber
 TB-6 - heavy bomber
 I-8 - 1930 fighter
 I-12 - 1931 fighter 
 I-14 - 1933 fighter
 MTB-2 - 1937 bomber flying boat
 Tu-1 - 1947 night fighter
 Tu-8 - 1947 bomber
 Tu-12 - 1947 medium bomber
 Tu-72 - medium bomber
 Tu-73 - 1947 medium bomber
 Tu-75 - 1950 transport aircraft
 Tu-80 - 1949 strategic bomber
 Tu-82 - 1949 light bomber
 Tu-85 - 1951 strategic bomber
 Tu-91 - 1955 attack aircraft
 Tu-95LAL - 1961 experimental nuclear-powered strategic bomber
 Tu-98 - 1956 bomber
 Tu-107 - 1958 transport aircraft
 Tu-125 - bomber
 Tu-155 - 1988 experimental alternative fuel testbed
 Tu-2000 - strategic bomber
Civilian aircraft
 ANT-2 - 1924 passenger aircraft
 ANT-14 - 1931 airliner
 ANT-20 - 1934 airliner
 Tu-70 - 1946 airliner
 Tu-102 - airliner
 Tu-110 - 1957 airliner
 Tu-116 - 1957 airliner
 Tu-244 - transport
 Tu-334 - 1999 airliner

Planned
 Frigate Ecojet - airliner
 PAK DA - strategic bomber
 Tu-324 - regional jet
 Tu-330 - transport aircraft
 Tu-444 - business jet

Unmanned aerial vehicles
Production
 Tu-123 - 1960 reconnaissance unmanned aerial vehicle
 Tu-141 - 1974 reconnaissance unmanned aerial vehicle
 Tu-143 - 1970 reconnaissance unmanned aerial vehicle
Experimental
 Tu-121 - 1959 unmanned aerial vehicle
 Voron - reconnaissance unmanned aerial vehicle

Yakovlev

Production
Military aircraft
 AIR-6 - 1932 light utility aircraft 
 UT-1 - 1936 trainer
 UT-2 - 1937 trainer  
 Yak-1 - 1940 fighter
 Yak-2 - 1939 light bomber
 Yak-3 - 1941 fighter
 Yak-4 - 1940 light bomber
 Yak-6 - 1942 utility transport aircraft
 Yak-7 - 1940 trainer and fighter
 Yak-9 - 1942 fighter
 Yak-10 - 1944 light liaison aircraft
 Yak-11 - 1945 trainer
 Yak-12 - 1946 liaison and utility aircraft
 Yak-15 - 1946 fighter
 Yak-17 - 1947 fighter
 Yak-18 - 1946 trainer
 Yak-18T - 1967 trainer and aerobatic aircraft
 Yak-23 - 1947 fighter
 Yak-25 - 1952 interceptor and reconnaissance aircraft
 Yak-27 - 1960 interceptor and reconnaissance aircraft
 Yak-28 - 1958 tactical bomber, reconnaissance aircraft, electronic warfare aircraft, interceptor, trainer
 Yak-38 - 1971 carrier-based fighter
 Yak-52 - 1976 trainer
 Yak-130 - 1996 advanced trainer and light attack aircraft
 Yak-152 - 2016 basic trainer  
Civilian aircraft
 AIR-1 - 1927 biplane
 AIR-3 - monoplane
 AIR-5 - 1931 monoplane
 AIR-7 - aerobatic aircraft
 Yak-32 - 1960 aerobatic aircraft
 Yak-40 - 1966 regional jet
 Yak-42 - 1975 airliner
 Yak-50 (1975) - 1975 aerobatic aircraft
 Yak-54 - 1993 aerobatic aircraft
 Yak-55 - 1981 aerobatic aircraft
 Yak-58 - 1993 utility transport aircraft
 Yak-112 - 1992 utility aircraft

Experimental
Military aircraft
 UT-3 - 1938 trainer
 Yak-5 - 1944 trainer
 Yak-8 - 1944 utility aircraft
 Yak-16 - 1947 light transport aircraft 
 Yak-19 - 1947 fighter
 Yak-20 - 1949 trainer
 Yak-25 (1947) - 1947 interceptor
 Yak-26 - 1956 tactical bomber 
 Yak-30 (1948) - 1948 interceptor
 Yak-30 (1960) - 1960 trainer
 Yak-33 - fighter, bomber and reconnaissance aircraft
 Yak-36 - 1963 technology demonstrator 
 Yak-43 - fighter
 Yak-44 - carrier-based airborne early warning and control aircraft
 Yak-45 - air superiority fighter
 Yak-46 - airliner
 Yak-50 (1949) - 1949 all-weather and night interceptor
 Yak-53 - 1982 trainer
 Yak-140 - fighter
 Yak-141 - 1987 fighter
 Yak-200 - 1953 multi-engine trainer
 Yak-1000 - technology demonstrator
 VVP-6 - 
Civilian aircraft
 Yak-48 - business and regional jet 
 Yak-77 - business and regional jet

Unmanned aerial vehicles
 Pchela - 1990 surveillance unmanned aerial vehicle

Gliders
 Yak-14 - 1948 military transport glider

Helicopters
Production
 Yak-24 - 1952 transport helicopter
Experimental
 EG - 1947 experimental helicopter
 Yak-60 - transport helicopter
 Yak-100 - 1948 transport helicopter

Mil

Helicopters
Production
 Mil Mi-24
 Mil Mi-28
 Mil Mi-8
Mil Mi-17
Mil Mi-6
Mil Mi-2

References

Lists of aircraft